Pierre Bertrand de Colombier (1299–1361), French cardinal and diplomat, was born at Colombier in Ardèche.

He was nephew and namesake of Cardinal Pierre Bertrand of Annonay. After a careful juristic education he was successively advocate at the parlement of Paris, intendant of the council of the count of Nevers (1321), and counsellor-clerk to the parlement (1329).

Having taken holy orders, he became dean of St Quentin in 1330, and was employed to negotiate the marriage of the duke of Normandy, the future king John the Good of France, with the daughter of the king of Bohemia. In 1335 he became bishop of Nevers, in 1339 bishop of Arras, and contributed to bring the county of Flanders into the kingdom of France.

Created cardinal priest of St Susanna in 1344, he was employed by the pope on important missions, notably to negotiate peace or an armistice between France and England. Having become bishop of Ostia in 1353, he was sent next year to Charles IV of Germany, and induced him to come to Italy to be crowned emperor at Rome, 1355. In 1356 he went to France to try to arrange a peace with England, and died in 1361 at the priory of Montaud near Avignon.

References

Sources
Mazon, A., Essai historique sur l'état du Vivarais pendant la guerre de cent ans (Paris, 1889)
 Catholic Encyclopedia article on Pierre Bertrand and his uncle

1299 births
1361 deaths
People from Ardèche
14th-century French cardinals
Cardinal-bishops of Ostia
14th-century diplomats
Bishops of Arras
Bishops of Nevers
Medieval French diplomats